K15 or K-15 may refer to:

 K-15 (Kansas highway)
 K-15 (television series), a Macedonian comedy program
 K-15 Sagarika, an Indian submarine-launched ballistic missile 
 , a submarine of the Royal Navy
 , a corvette of the Royal Navy
 Kalinin K-15, a planned Soviet rocket fighter aircraft
 Keratin 15
 Sonata in B flat, K. 15, by Wolfgang Amadeus Mozart